The British Society of Clinical Hypnosis (BSCH) is an organization composed of professional hypnotherapists.

The main objective the BSCH is to establish standards of training and ethical practice regarding the use of hypnosis and hypnotherapy; within the United Kingdom there are (2010) currently no statutory regulations regarding hypnosis. The society was created in the early 1980s and was originally called the Association of Clinical Hypnotherapists. This name was subsequently changed to the British Society of Clinical Hypnotherapists, until finally becoming the British Society of Clinical Hypnosis in 1996.

It is a non-profit organisation. Though predominantly a UK-based organisation, the society has members in several Commonwealth countries, particularly Malaysia and Singapore, but also members in Australia, Canada, New Zealand and South Africa as well as other EU countries including the Republic of Ireland, Portugal, France, Germany and Italy.

The society maintains a searchable database  of therapists qualified to society standards and a helpline, which is open during office hours.

See also 
American Society of Clinical Hypnosis

References
NHS information (UK)
The Daily Telegraph, August 8, 2005 - Look into my eyes... You won't feel a thing

External links
British Society of Clinical Hypnosis

Professional associations based in the United Kingdom
Hypnosis organizations
1980s establishments in the United Kingdom
Medical and health organisations based in the United Kingdom